Make a Little Magic is the twelfth album from The Dirt Band, formerly known as the Nitty Gritty Dirt Band. This album includes the title cut which reached number 77 on the Billboard Hot Country Singles & Tracks chart but peaked at number 25 on the U.S. Billboard Hot 100  with Nicolette Larson singing backup. The album reached number 62 on the US Billboard 200 chart. It also includes their cover version of the Cindy Bullens tune, "Anxious Heart".

Track listing
"Make a Little Magic" (Hanna, Hathaway, Carpenter) – 3:55
"Badlands" (Hathaway, Carpenter, Hanna) – 4:14
"High School Yearbook" (Hanna, Hathaway, Carpenter) – 2:44
"Leigh Anne" (Holster) – 4:10
"Riding Alone" (Hathaway, Carpenter, Hanna) – 2:20
"Anxious Heart" (Bullens, Veitch) – 2:43
"Do It! (Party Lights)" (Fadden, Carpenter, Hathaway, Hanna) – 4:24
"Harmony" (Hanna, Fadden) – 4:22
"Too Good to Be True" (Carpenter, Hanna) – 3:38
"Mullen's Farewell to America" (McEuen, Garth) – 1:48

Personnel
Jimmie Fadden – electric and acoustic harmonica
John McEuen – lap steel guitar, mandolin, acoustic guitar on "Mullen's Farwell"
Jeff Hanna – lead vocals, rhythm and lead guitar, background vocals
Bob Carpenter – lead vocals on "Leigh Ann" and "Harmony"
Richard Hathaway – electric bass, background vocals
Al Garth – keyboards, alto and tenor saxophone, violin, viola
Additional Musicians
Rick Shlosser – drums and programming
Nicolette Larson – background and harmony vocals on "Make A Little Magic", "Do It" and "Harmony"
Haden Gregg – background vocals on "Anxious Heart" and "Badlands"
Geoffrey Morris – slide guitar on "Too Good To Be True"

Production
Producer – Jeff Hanna and Bob Edwards

Chart performance

References
All information is from the album liner notes unless otherwise noted

Nitty Gritty Dirt Band albums
1980 albums
Liberty Records albums